Critical Care Medicine is a peer-reviewed monthly medical journal in the field of intensive care medicine. The journal was established in 1973 with William C. Shoemaker as the founding editor. It is the official publication of the Society of Critical Care Medicine and is published by Lippincott Williams & Wilkins. The journal's editor-in-chief is Timothy G. Buchman.

Abstracting and indexing
The journal is abstracted and indexed in:

According to the Journal Citation Reports, the journal has a 2020 impact factor of 7.598, ranking it 5th out of 82 journals in the category "‘Critical Care and Intensive Care Medicine".

Editors 

 William C. Shoemaker, 1972-1991
 Bart Chernow, 1991-1997
 Joseph E. Parrillo, 1997-2014
 Timothy G. Buchman, 2015-present

References

External links

Society of Critical Care Medicine

Publications established in 1973
Emergency medicine journals
English-language journals
Intensive care medicine
Lippincott Williams & Wilkins academic journals
Monthly journals